Daniel L. Migliore is a Christian theologian and author. He is Professor Emeritus of Theology at Princeton Theological Seminary.

His works include:

 Faith Seeking Understanding: An Introduction to Christian Theology (1980) (Third Edition, 2014)
 Rachel's Cry: Prayer of Lament and Rebirth of Hope (with Kathleen D. Billman, 2007)
 The Power of God and the Gods of Power (2008)
 Called to Freedom: Liberation Theology and the Future of Christian Doctrine (1980)
 The Power of God (1983)
 The Lord's Prayer: Perspectives for Reclaiming Christian Prayer  (1993)
 Hope for the Kingdom and Responsibility for the World (1994)
 Protestant Theology at the Crossroads: How to Face the Crucial Tasks for Theology in the Twenty-First Century (with Gerhard Sauter, 2007)
 The Church and Israel: Romans 9-11 (with Paul M. van Buren, Otfried Hofius and J. Christiaan Beker, 1990)

About: He holds a B.D. from Princeton Theological Seminary and an M.A. and Ph.D. from Princeton University. He received an honorary doctorate (humane letters) from his alma mater Westminster College (Pennsylvania). An ordained Presbyterian minister, he is a member of the Presbytery of New Brunswick and frequently teaches in local congregations. His areas of interest include systematic theology, Karl Barth, the Trinity, and Christology. During his career he taught courses on Christology, the doctrine of God, the theology of Karl Barth, Barth's Church Dogmatics, and an introductory course on the doctrines and practices of Christian faith. He retired as Charles Hodge Professor of Systematic Theology at Princeton Theological Seminary in 2009.

References

Living people
Princeton Theological Seminary faculty
Presbyterian Church (USA) teaching elders
Princeton Theological Seminary alumni
Year of birth missing (living people)